Cribrohammus is a genus of beetles in the family Cerambycidae, containing the following species:

 Cribrohammus chinensis Breuning, 1966
 Cribrohammus fragosus Holzschuh, 1998

References

Agapanthiini
Taxa named by Stephan von Breuning (entomologist)